Asticcacaulis solisilvae is a Gram-negative, obligately aerobic, chemoheterotrophic and motile  bacterium from the genus of Asticcacaulis which has been isolated from forest soil from the Cheonggyesan Mountain in Korea.

References

External links
Type strain of Asticcacaulis solisilvae at BacDive -  the Bacterial Diversity Metadatabase

Caulobacterales
Bacteria described in 2013